Enckell is a Finnish-Swedish surname. Notable people with the surname include:

Annina Enckell (born 1957), Finnish award-winning playwright and screenwriter
Carl Enckell (1876–1959), Finnish politician, diplomat, officer and businessman
Magnus Enckell (1870–1925), Finnish symbolist painter
Rabbe Enckell (1903–1974), Finnish author, writer and poet

References

Finnish-language surnames
Swedish-language surnames